

Lake Cristallina is a lake in the canton Ticino, Switzerland.

Cristallina